Sahuarita Lake is a human-made lake located  south of downtown Tucson in Sahuarita, Arizona. The lake was created in 2000 and opened for public use in 2001.

Recreation 
Park Hours: The park is open from sunrise to sunset.

Rules: Swimming, wading, glass containers, littering, cleaning of fish on premises and alcoholic beverages are prohibited. Boating permitted only between sunrise and sunset. Gas motors prohibited. Must have proper floatation devices on board. Animals must be restrained by a leash at all times. Other rules posted.

Fish species 
 Rainbow Trout
 Largemouth Bass
 Sunfish
 Catfish (Channel)

References

External links
 Arizona Fishing Locations Map
 Arizona Boating Locations Facilities Map
 Video of Sahuarita Lake, Arizona
 Arizona Game & Fish Department
 

Reservoirs in Pima County, Arizona
Reservoirs in Arizona